Bullock is a ghost town in Harding County, in the U.S. state of South Dakota.

History
Bullock was laid out in 1911, and named in honor of Seth Bullock, a Western sheriff. A post office called Bullock was established in 1911, and remained in operation until 1957. It was founded on the homestead of Knute Boresen Grasby.

References

Ghost towns in South Dakota
Geography of Harding County, South Dakota